How Many Kings: Songs for Christmas is the fifth official album release from Christian rock band downhere released on October 6, 2009.

Track listing
"How Many Kings" – 4:19
"God Rest Ye Merry Gentlemen" – 3:05
"Angels from the Realms of Glory" – 4:21
"Christmas In Our Hearts" – 4:19
"Silent Night" – 3:51
"Good King Wenceslas" – 3:03
"What Child Is This" – 3:05
"Bring a Torch, Jeanette, Isabella" – 3:35
"Five Golden Rings" – 0:11
"Glory to God in the Highest" – 3:25
"Gift Carol" – 4:03
"We Wish You a Merry Christmas" – 1:51
"How Many Kings [Re-Imagined]" – 5:30

References

Downhere albums
2009 Christmas albums
Christmas albums by Canadian artists